Connecticut's 113th House of Representatives district elects one member of the Connecticut House of Representatives.  It encompasses parts of Shelton and has been represented by Republican Jason Perillo since 2007.

Recent elections

2020

2018

2016

2014

2012

References

113